Breviceps is a genus of frogs in the family Brevicipitidae. Species in the genus Breviceps are commonly known as rain frogs or short-headed frogs. They occur in arid to semiarid climates of East Africa and Southern Africa.

Taxonomy
The genus Breviceps consists of 20 species, of which most occur in southern Africa. There are five species found in the Western Cape, B. gibbosus, B. fuscus (black rain frog), B. rosei (Rose's rain frog), B. montanus (mountain rain frog) and B. acutirostris (strawberry rain frog). Two species are found in arid areas and other species are found in the eastern and northern parts of southern Africa.

Description
Species of the genus Breviceps are sexually dimorphic: males are much smaller than females. This prevents normal amplexus; instead, males and females produce an adhesive secretion from the skin that allows them to "stick" together during mating.

Ecology and behaviour
Species of the genus Breviceps spend most of the year underground; even when on the surface, they are inconspicuous because of their slow movements and cryptic colouration. They walk rather than hop. They are able to burrow rapidly, backwards, into the soil by using the enlarged, spade-like metatarsal tubercles on their feet.

These frogs emerge after rain to feed on small arthropods such as ants, termites, beetles, moths, woodlice, amphipods, juvenile millipedes, and caterpillars hence the name rain frogs. Reproduction also occurs during the rainy season. Choruses start immediately after heavy rains, although this may be delayed in colder areas. Eggs are laid in chambers below the surface of the soil, rocks, or fallen logs. After hatching, the movements of the tadpoles make the remains of the egg mass into a froth. The female remains close to the egg chamber until the tadpoles are fully developed.

References

 
Brevicipitidae
Amphibians of Africa
Amphibian genera
Taxa named by Blasius Merrem